Metaxa is a Greek amber spirit created by Spyros Metaxa in 1888. 

The Metaxa Collection consists of Metaxa aged 5 Stars, Metaxa aged 7 Stars, Metaxa aged 12 Stars, Metaxa Grande Fine, Metaxa Private Reserve, Metaxa Angels’ Treasure, and Aen Metaxa. 

Metaxa is sold in more than 50 countries, including China, Canada, United States, Australia, New Zealand, Austria, Germany, Greece, Czech Republic, Slovak Republic, Romania, Belgium, Netherlands, Luxembourg, Estonia, Latvia, Lithuania, Ukraine, Hungary, Poland, Russia, United Kingdom, Republic of Ireland.

Metaxa has been part of the Rémy Cointreau Group since 2000.

History 

Spyros Metaxa was born in 1848 into a family of Greek silk merchants. His first business was in the trade of fine goods. During his travels, he was exposed to a number of different spirits and wines from all around the world. According to the company, spirits of the time tended to be harsh on the palate. Spyros Metaxa wanted a smoother drink and created Metaxa in 1888.

The "Salamina Warrior", the Metaxa emblem, is inspired by an ancient medallion that Spyros Metaxa found when building his distillery in Piraeus in 1888.

Metaxa became a commercial success.  It began exporting to countries across the Mediterranean, and in 1900 it was first exported to the US.

In 1968, the distillery and the Metaxa cellars were relocated to new facilities in Athens' northern suburb of Kifissia where they still are today.

Although it was first compared to Cognac, and later to brandy, Metaxa does not fall under either of these spirit categories due to the presence of the Muscat wines and the Mediterranean botanicals.

Creation 

The company's current Metaxa master, the equivalent of a master distiller or master blender, Constantinos Raptis, is the fifth since 1888. He has overseen the production process for more than 25 years.

Metaxa is made from Muscat wines from Samos and wine distillates, which are aged separately and then combined in Limousin oak casks. Mediterranean botanicals are added as part of the finishing process.

Samos 

Samos is a Greek island located in the eastern Aegean Sea. The island's second-highest mountain is Mount Ambelos/Karvouni (1,153 m). Ampelos means "vine" in Greek. Grapes, primarily Muscat, are cultivated in terraces and hand-picked.

Collection 

Metaxa 5 Stars: Floral, intended to be served neat, on ice or in long drinks.
Metaxa 7 Stars: Fruity, served neat, on ice or in cocktails.
Metaxa 12 Stars: The company's flagship product, intended to be served neat, with a single piece of ice, or in cocktails.
Metaxa Grande Fine: Sold in a porcelain bottle created by a Greek designer, served neat or on ice.
Metaxa Private Reserve: The creation of Constantinos Raptis in 1992. Created once a year, in a single batch, served neat.
Metaxa Angels' Treasure: Aged for decades, aromatic, served neat.
Metaxa AEN Cask No 1: In 2008, to celebrate its 120th anniversary, a mix of over 200 blends drawn from Cask No. 1 named after Spyros Metaxa. Sold in crystal decanters, served neat.
Metaxa AEN Cask No 2: In 2018, to celebrate the 130th anniversary of the company, Metaxa released 130 decanters of blends from "The Family of Original Casks", brought in from the first distillery in Piraeus.

Awards 

Metaxa 5 Stars - Wine Enthusiast, 87 Points: "Best buy, very good, recommended". 
Metaxa 7 Stars – Drinks International Cocktail Challenge, Metaxa Ginger Sour, Bronze Medal 
Metaxa 12 Stars – IWSC Silver and Bronze Medals, ISC Bronze Medal, USC 86 Points 
Metaxa Private Reserve– Wine Enthusiast, 87 Points: "Very good, recommended". 
Metaxa Angels' Treasure – The Spirits Master Gold Medal

References

External links

 The official homepage

Distilled drinks
Greek distilled drinks
Greek liqueurs
Greek brands
Greek inventions
Food and drink companies established in 1888
1888 establishments in Greece